is a series of two original video animations created by Studio Deen that retell the Kyoto arc of Nobuhiro Watsuki's manga Rurouni Kenshin. The story focuses on the young Oniwabanshu Makimashi Misao who encounters the protagonist, the wanderer Himura Kenshin, who is on a quest to defeat the forces of his hitokiri successor Shishio Makoto.

Plot

Release
A new Rurouni Kenshin project was announced in April 2011's Jump Square. Director Kazuhiro Furuhashi, Studio Deen, and the original cast returned after nine years (except Hirotaka Suzuoki who died in 2006; Saitō Hajime was voiced by Ken Narita). The project was split into two parts and is a remake of the second arc, the Kyoto arc, with some changes. Part I was released on December 17, 2011 and titled , which was selected from a fan suggestion, ran at Tokyo's Cinema Sunshine Ikebukuro theater and Osaka's Cine-Libre Umeda theater for one week only. Part II, was released on June 23, 2012 and ran for three weeks in ten theaters.

Aniplex of America announced at Otakon 2011 that they were in "negotiations" for the English language rights to the films. Aniplex released part I on DVD and Blu-ray on March 21, 2012 in Japan, while Part II was released on August 22, 2012. In 2013, North American licensor Sentai Filmworks released both films together on DVD and Blu-ray, compiling them together onto a single disc.

Reception
The New Kyoto Arc OVAs received negative reception from critics. Capsule Computers stated that since the New Kyoto Arc is written from Misao's point of view, many of Kenshin's allies did not get much screentime in comparison. Nevertheless, the critic praised the voice work of Meg Bauman as Misao's actress. Bamboo Dong from Anime News Network highly criticized Kenshin in the OVA's retelling of the Kyoto arc for lacking all the development he received in both the manga and anime of this arc. Dong also referred to Shishio as "everyone's favorite mummy man" but found disgust in how the OVA's staff portrayed him having a sexual relationship despite his body being in poor shape to do so as a result of suffering major burns. Dong also criticized the lack of good fight scenes despite all the buildup Shishio received in order to conquer Japan through his forces. Indiewire found the New Kyoto Arc inferior to the original despite still being faithful to the source material. Despite noting the OVA's weak aspects, Fandom Post still found the series enjoyable for this attempt at revisiting Kenshin's fight against the Ten Swords.

The Blu-ray and DVD of the second volume of the duology sold more than six thousand copies within the first week of its Japanese release, ranking eighth and ninth, respectively.

References

External links
 

2011 anime OVAs
Aniplex
Kyoto in fiction
OVAs based on manga
Rurouni Kenshin
Samurai in anime and manga
Sentai Filmworks
Studio Deen